The Sukhoi T-4, or "Aircraft 100", or "Project 100", or "Sotka" was a Soviet high-speed reconnaissance, anti-ship and strategic bomber aircraft that did not proceed beyond the prototype stage. It is sometimes called the Su-100.

Design and development

In 1963, the Soviet government held a request for proposal among the aircraft design bureaus, with the aim of developing an aircraft analogous to the North American XB-70 Valkyrie.
Development of the T-4 required massive research efforts to develop the technologies necessary, including the manufacturing technologies to machine and weld the materials necessary to withstand sustained Mach 3 flight. Nearly 600 patents or inventions are attributed to the program.
The first flying prototype was finally completed in the autumn of 1971. Work continued on an additional three airframes (one for static testing) through 1975. In 1974, the Ministry of Aviation Industry ordered work suspended on the T-4 project, which was officially scrapped on 19 December 1975.

The aircraft's droop nose lowered to provide visibility during takeoff and landing. Drogue parachutes were used in addition to conventional wheel brakes.

Operational history
The first T-4, designated "101", first flew on 22August 1972. The test pilot was Vladimir Ilyushin, son of famed aircraft designer Sergei Ilyushin, and the navigator was Nikolai Alfyorov. Testing continued to 19January 1974. The T-4 flew only ten times for a total of 10 hours and 20 minutes..

Aircraft on display
One T-4 survives. Aircraft "101" is on display at the Central Air Force Museum in Monino near Moscow. The serial numbers of the prototypes were "101" to "106". Only "101" and "102" were built, while other additional prototypes "103" and "104" were under construction, and "105" and "106" only existed on draft charts. Only the "101" completed all the test flights and flew the last test flight before the project was canceled on 22 January 1974. The rest of the prototypes were scrapped.

Specifications

Gallery

See also

References

External links

Sukhoi T-4 "Sotka" at the Russian Air Force Museum 
Sukhoi Company website

T-04
Canard aircraft
Delta-wing aircraft
1970s Soviet bomber aircraft
Abandoned military aircraft projects of the Soviet Union
Quadjets
Aircraft first flown in 1972